William Mark Lanier (born October 20, 1960) is an American trial lawyer and founder and CEO of the Lanier Law Firm. He has led a number of high profile product litigation suits resulting in billions of dollars in damages, including Johnson & Johnson baby powder and Merck & Co.'s Vioxx drug.

Legal career
After graduating from Texas Tech University School of Law in 1984, Lanier began his legal career working in Houston for Fulbright & Jaworski (now Norton Rose Fulbright), working in the appellate and trial divisions. In 1990, Lanier founded The Lanier Law Firm.

Lanier represented Rubicon Oil and Gas in 1990 in a breach of contract and fraud lawsuit against Amoco. A Matagorda County, Texas jury found that Amoco had wrongly backed out of a contract to sell Wyoming oil fields to Rubicon. The jury verdict totaled $480 million.

In the 1998 trial of Aaron v. Abex, Lanier was the lead counsel for a group of steelworkers who contracted asbestos disease at an Alabama steel mill. The jury verdict was $115 million.

In 2004 Lanier founded the Christian Trial Lawyers Association.

Vioxx litigation

In 2005, Lanier represented Carol Ernst in a lawsuit against Merck & Co., a pharmaceutical company and manufacturer of Vioxx, an anti-inflammatory drug used to treat osteoarthritis and acute pain conditions. Ernst was married to Robert Ernst, a former marathon runner who died after taking the medication. The case was initially decided in Ernst's favor, with a jury awarding her a $253 million verdict. In another case Lanier obtained consumer fraud findings against Merck who it was claimed had misled doctors and patients by concealing information about Vioxx and its risks. The first ruling was overturned on appeal in 2008 with the court noting Lanier "had not proved that Vioxx caused Mr. Ernst’s death" and compensatory damages were reduced in the second.

In cases about Vioxx, hip replacements and talcum powder he has faced John Beisner as an opponent lawyer.

Artificial hip litigation
Following the 2010 DePuy Hip Recall, Lanier represented plaintiffs in several lawsuits against Johnson & Johnson and DePuy Synthes, which Johnson & Johnson acquired in 1998. The implants were said to cause a build-up of metal ions in the blood, causing groin pain, allergic reactions, bone erosion and tissue death. The verdict included $140 million in total compensatory damages and about $360 million in punitive damages. The jury ruled that the implants were defectively designed and that the companies failed to warn the public about their risks.

In March 2016, five North Texas residents being represented by Lanier were awarded about $500 million for alleged complications arising from the hip implants. The award was later reduced to $151 million at appeal. In November 2016, Lanier won a $1 billion payout to six plaintiffs affected by the implants, followed by a further $247 million to six New York residents.

In the third trial, a Dallas federal jury award $1 billion in December 2016 to six California residents represented by Mark Lanier who claimed defective Pinnacle metal-on-metal hip implants made by Johnson & Johnson were defectively designed and that the companies failed to warn consumers about the risks. 
The case at trial was In re: DePuy Orthopaedics Inc. Pinnacle Hip Implant Products Liability Litigation, in the U.S. District Court for the Northern District of Texas.

In November 2017, a federal jury in Dallas returned a $247 million verdict against Johnson & Johnson in the fourth bellwether trial in multidistrict litigation related to injuries and medical complications caused by the Pinnacle metal-on-metal hip implant. Mark Lanier was trial lawyer for a group of six New York residents whose hips had to be surgically removed. The panel awarded a total of $79 million in actual damages and $168 million in punitive damages against Johnson & Johnson.

In April 2018 a retrial was ordered by the 5th Circuit court of appeals in the case against DePuy Orthopaedics, with the appeal judges accusing Lanier of "inflammatory tactics and outright deception" in the trial. Reuters reported that the ruling had a "truly extraordinary tone" when criticising Lanier's actions at the trial. Lanier had told jurors that in contrast to DePuy’s expert witnesses in the case, his expert witnesses were unpaid when in fact they were compensated $65,000 after the trial. Lanier indicated that he disclosed the post-trial payments to the defendants commenting to Reuters, "this came to light because I told the parties about it...I never hid anything." Lanier also insinuated that DePuy were liable because they had been accused of bribing officials from Saddam Hussein's Iraqi regime and claimed that executives at DePuy were racist. It was the second bellwether trial in multidistrict litigation (MDL) of more than 9,000 similar lawsuits consolidated in the U.S. District Court for the Northern District of Texas.

The retrial began in January 2019 and in May that year Reuters reported that Johnson & Johnson had reached an agreement to settle 95% of the 6,000 cases for a $1bn.

After a retrial was ordered by  U.S. Fifth Circuit Court of Appeals, Johnson & Johnson agreed to a $1 billion settlement to resolve the bulk of the hip implant defect lawsuits in January 2019.

The six consolidated New York lawsuits at the trial were consolidated cases are Alicea v. DePuy Orthopaedics; Barzel v. DePuy; Kirschner v. DePuy; Miura v. DePuy; Stevens v. DePuy; and Stevens v. DePuy, in the U.S. District Court for the Northern District of Texas.

Johnson & Johnson talc litigation

In 2018, Lanier led the trial team representing 22 women who had filed suit against Johnson & Johnson. The lawsuit alleged that the company's talcum powder products contained asbestos and that, after several years of use, had caused each of the women's ovarian cancer. The trial lasted six weeks and resulted in $550 million in compensatory damages and $4.14 billion in punitive damages being awarded to the plaintiffs.

Johnson & Johnson appealed the jury verdict in June 2020, and the Eastern District Court of Appeals of Missouri upheld $2.11 billion of the $4.69 billion jury verdict. The opinion stated that Johnson & Johnson had been aware of the potential asbestos contamination for several decades. On June 1, 2021, the Supreme Court of the United States denied a request by Johnson & Johnson to overturn the $2.11 billion verdict.

BP energy royalty litigation
Mark Lanier and The Lanier Law Firm represented a class of more than 1,000 Oklahoma natural gas well royalty owners alleging that BP had underpaid royalties by deducting processing costs and post-production midstream services. In October 2018, the reached a $221 million settlement with BP LLC.

Opioids

In late 2019, Lanier represented Summit and Cuyahoga counties in the first trial against pharmaceutical companies for damages caused by the distribution of addictive opioid painkillers. The defendants included distributers McKesson Corporation, Cardinal Health, AmerisourceBergen, Walgreens and Teva Pharmaceuticals. The lawsuit claimed that the drug distributors failed to monitor sales as required by federal law and report suspicious activity, which contributed to opioid addictions. Hours before the start of a trial, three pharmaceutical distributers and a manufacturer reached a settlement $260 million to resolve litigation over damages caused by the opioid epidemic.

Lanier also represented Trumbull and Lake counties against retail pharmacies for excessive distribution of addictive opioid painkillers. The lawsuit alleged that pharmacies operated by CVS Health, Walgreens, and Walmart created a public nuisance through the over-prescription of pain medication in those communities which contributed to hundreds of overdose deaths. The trial lasted six weeks with the jury returning a verdict finding the Ohio pharmacies liable. It was the first trial where pharmacy companies defended themselves amidst the opioid epidemic, and Lanier indicated the counties were seeking $1 billion.

Google Antitrust Litigation
In December 2020, Mark Lanier and The Lanier Law Firm were hired by Texas Attorney General Ken Paxton to represent the state of Texas in antitrust litigation brought against Google parent company, Alphabet Inc. Texas was leading a coalition of state attorneys general in claims that Google's dominant position in digital advertising created an unfair competitive advantage.

EpiPen MDL
Mark Lanier is the lead trial lawyer representing EpiPen buyers accusing Pfizer and Mylan of illegally inflating prices of the EpiPen emergency treatment for allergic reactions. The first trial in multidistrict litigation consolidated in Kansas federal court is scheduled for September 2021.

In January 2021, Mark Lanier was appointed to the plaintiff steering committee for multidistrict litigation. More than 40 lawsuits consolidated in New Jersey federal court charge that Johnson & Johnson's pharmaceutical unit concealed harmful side effects of the Elmiron bladder cyst medication, resulting in serious eye damage.

Remmington Rifle Litigation
Mark Lanier and The Lanier Law Firm represented owners of the Remington Model 700 bolt-action rifle in class action litigation related to design defects that caused the rifle to fire without the trigger being pulled. In July 2018, a federal appeals panel approved a settlement for millions of the rifles to be retrofitted with new trigger mechanisms.

Personal life

Lanier was born in 1960 in Lubbock, Texas to a railroad salesman and housewife. As of 2005, he was married with five children.

His brother-in-law is former Texas state representative Kevin Roberts, who ran against Dan Crenshaw in the 2018 Republican primary to replace retiring Congressman Ted Poe. During the campaign, Lanier funded a super PAC which ran ads against Crenshaw.
Lanier appears as a character with the same name in the 2011 film Puncture.

Bibliography

References

Living people
Texas lawyers
1960 births
American Christian writers
People from Dallas